The , at  long, is the third longest in Japan and the longest in Hokkaidō.

It originates from Mount Ishikari in the Daisetsuzan Volcanic Group and flows through Asahikawa and Sapporo. Major tributaries of the river include the Chūbetsu, Uryū, Sorachi and Toyohira rivers. Until 40,000 years ago, it flowed into the Pacific Ocean near Tomakomai. Lava from the volcanic Shikotsu mountains dammed the river and moved its mouth to the Ishikari Bay.

The name of the river is derived from the Ainu for "make(s) itself go round about something" (i-si-kari < kari meaning "(to be a) circle, round, loop; spin, turn, go around, go back and forth," si- "reflexive prefix, itself, oneself," and i- "it, something, an impersonal third person object marking prefix, middle voice inflection prefix), i.e. "winding (river)." As it suggests, the river once meandered in the Ishikari Plain and was as long as the Shinano River, the longest river in Japan. Massive construction shortened the river by 100 kilometers and left many  in the plain.

The landscape and human activities along the Ishikari River, especially the hard life of tenant farmers, are described in the novel 'The Absentee Landlord' published in 1929 by the Japanese writer Takiji Kobayashi.

References

External links 
 Ishikari-gawa - Britannica

Rivers of Hokkaido
Rivers of Japan